A sponge is a cleaning aid made of soft, porous material. Typically used for cleaning impervious surfaces, sponges are especially good at absorbing water and water-based solutions.

Originally made from natural sea sponges, they are most commonly made from synthetic materials today.

Etymology 
The word comes from the Ancient Greek term , which in turn is probably derived from a Mediterranean Pre-Indo European substrate.

History 
The first reference of sponges used for hygiene dates from Ancient Greece. Competitors of the Olympic Games bathed themselves with sea sponges soaked in olive oil or perfume before competing. In the book Odyssey by the Greek poet Homer, the god Hephaestus cleans his hands, face, and chest with a sea sponge, and the servants in the Odysseus palace also used sea sponges to clean the tables after the meals the suitors of Penelope had there. The Greek philosophers Aristotle and Plato also mentioned sea sponges in both scientific and historic contexts in their works. Ancient Greeks and Romans also used sea sponges tied to sticks for anal hygiene, a tool known as the xylospongium, and washed them with sea water.

Ancient Romans also used sea sponges extensively for hygiene and other uses. The belief that sponges had therapeutic properties led to their usage in medicine for cleaning wounds and treating disease.

In the New Testament, a Roman soldier offers Jesus Christ the Holy Sponge soaked in vinegar on the tip of his spear (some versions say staff) for Jesus to drink during his crucifixion.

Synthetic sponges were made possible to be manufactured only after the invention of polyester in the 1920s and the commercial production of polyurethane foam in 1952.

Material
Synthetic sponges can be made of polyester, polyurethane, or vegetal cellulose. Polyurethane is used in polyester sponges for their abrasive side. Polyester sponges are more common for dish washing and are usually soft and yellow.  Microplastics and nanoplastics can be released from kitchen sponges during use.

Vegetal cellulose sponges made of wood fiber are more used for bathing and skin cleaning, and are usually tougher and more expensive than polyester sponges. They are considered more eco-friendly than polyester sponges as they are biodegradable and made of natural materials.

Harboring bacteria

A sponge can be a medium for the growth of harmful bacteria or fungi, especially when it is allowed to remain wet between uses.

Cleaning
Several methods have been used to clean sponges. Studies have investigated the use of the microwave to clean non-metallic domestic sponges that have been thoroughly moistened. A 2006 study found that microwaving wet sponges for two minutes (at 1000 watt power) killed 99% of coliforms, E. coli, and MS2 phages, but Bacillus cereus spores required four minutes. After some fires were caused by people trying to replicate the results at home, the study's author urged people to make sure their sponges were wet. A 2009 study showed that the microwave and the dishwasher were both effective ways to clean domestic sponges.

In economy 
Countries around Caribbean and the Mediterranean Sea are the largest sea sponge exporters, whereas the largest importers are developed European and North-American countries. Tunisia is the world's main sea sponge exporter, exporting 90% of its sponge production. France is the main importer, being supplied by Tunisia, but France's sponge demand has fallen in recent years.

Gallery

See also

Dishcloth
Ethylene-vinyl acetate – material that craft foam is made from ethylene-vinyl and acetate
Holy Sponge
Luffa aegyptiaca
Sponge metal
Capillary action
Shower puff

References

Cleaning tools
Cleaning products
Domestic implements